The St. Vrain Valley School District is the local school district for Longmont, Colorado, United States, and several nearby communities. It is the seventh largest district in the state.

Schools

Stand-alone preschools
 Spark! Discovery Preschool

Elementary schools
Ref:

Middle schools
 Altona Middle School
 Coal Ridge Middle School
 Erie Middle School
 Longs Peak Middle School
 Lyons Middle/Senior High School
 Mead Middle School
 Sunset Middle School
 Trail Ridge Middle School
 Westview Middle School

K-8 schools
 Thunder Valley K-8
 Timberline PK-8
 Soaring Heights PK-8

High schools
 Erie High School
 Frederick High School
 Longmont High School
 Lyons Middle/Senior High School
 Mead High School
 Niwot High School
 Silver Creek High School
 Skyline High School

Charter schools
 Aspen Ridge Preparatory School (K–7)
 Carbon Valley Academy (K–8, expanding to K–12)
 Flagstaff Academy (K–8)
 Imagine Charter School at Firestone (K–8)
 St Vrain Community Montessori School (pre K–8) 
 Twin Peaks Charter Academy (K–12)

References

External links
 

Longmont, Colorado
Education in Boulder County, Colorado
School districts in Colorado
Education in Weld County, Colorado